Video games in Ukraine began to emerge in the 1990s, with the appearance of the first studios. Subsequently, in the 2000-2010 in Ukraine there were several well-known video game series. Although the video game industry in Ukraine is only developing, video gaming is becoming more and more popular in the country.

Overview 
The study of the Ukrainian video game industry has not been carried out for a long time, despite the popularity of games developed in Ukraine. The question began to climb only in the second half of the 2000s. In part, this has been caused by the classes of Ukrainian developers, especially with regard to the value of its projects. But it was not a mystery that the creation of video games in Ukraine is cheaper than in the United States and Western Europe. In our country, various orders were performed, except for sounding and animation with the capture of the motion of actors. The reason for this was called market requirements and the lack of desired technologies. The volume of the Ukrainian video game market in 2013 became the largest history, 300 million US dollars. However, most of the profits are abandoned by foreign publishers. Some editions are called video games by the main cultural export of Ukraine to the west.

Major Ukrainian Video Games Companies:  GSC Game World, Best Way, Action Forms, 4A Games, N-Game Studios, Меридиан'93, Frogwares, Boolat Game Development Company, Dereza Production Studio, Persha Studia, Cyber Light Game Studio, Deep Shadows. The leader in the number of developer studio is the city of Kyiv.

History

The origin: the 1990s 
In 1993, Meridian'93 studio was created. It was they who created the first commercial Ukrainian game - Admiral Sea Battles devoted to marine battles. Dmitry Prokopov developed a concept game, wrote a script and worked on graphics. The creation of the concept was also participated in by the programmer Andriy Doroshchuk, and Viktor Sylak who also engaged in graphics. Music was written by Andrei Vasylenko. All of them then worked on over two subsequent team projects: Ancient Conquest and Submarine Titans. And Doroshchuk, Sylak and two more programmers from the team, Gregory Podgorny and Artem Kulakov, as part of The Creative Assembly Australia, even took part in the development of such strategies as Medieval II: Total War and Stormrise.

At the exhibition in Hamburg, where the developers went to present their game, they met representatives of the German company Koch Media (later it created a special Deep Silver label for video games). As a result of cooperation, the Germans were engaged in a publishing house and distribution agreement of Meridian'93 products in the West. In particular, they distributed Admiral Sea Battles in Germany. The release took place on September 30, 1996.

The first hits: the 2000s 
In 2001, the first part of the series Cossacks - European Wars, developed by GSC Game World. The idea to create the game Cossacks appeared in 1997, when Age of Empires was released, the development of the game began in 1998. The 17th-18th centuries were chosen because the Middle Ages would most likely be chosen to continue the Age of Empires and the Cossacks would emerge as its logical continuation rather than a competitor.  Initially, there was to be a confrontation between Ukraine and Russia in the Cossacks, and there were to be 4 nations in total: Ukrainians, Russians, Europeans, and Ottomans. The game was to be sold on the domestic market. After the MILIA exhibition in Cannes, where the demo version of the Cossacks received good reviews from reputable people involved in the creation and publishing of video games, it was decided to increase the number of nations to 16 and publish the game around the world. In order to be able to reproduce thousands of units on the map, a 2D version of the graphics was selected. The following year saw the continuation of the series - Cossacks: Back to War.

In the middle of the decade, the following games appeared: Sherlock Holmes, Vivisector: Beast Within, Cossacks 2: Napoleonic Wars, Soldiers: Heroes of World War II, Cryostasis: Sleep of Reason and Faces of War.

A real breakthrough was the S.T.A.L.K.E.R. series, developed by GSC Game World. The first part was released in 2007 and was called Shadow of Chernobyl. It was developed for 6 years. Later, books and movies appeared behind the game. The game takes place in an alternate reality, where on April 14, 2008 (there is a contradiction - the game itself mentions the date of April 12, 2008, and on the official website - April 12, 2006) there was a second explosion at the Chernobyl nuclear power plant. This explosion caused the appearance of the "Zone" - a place within which, various anomalous phenomena appear, such as a multidirectional gravitational flow of more than 100G. The history of the second explosion at the former Chernobyl nuclear power plant is shrouded in darkness, and, wanting to investigate this situation, the Ukrainian government is sending troops to the Chornobyl zone. However, their actions in the zone end in failure. Due to the failure of the experiments, the territory of the Zone was fenced, checkpoints were built at the main points of access to the Zone. After some time, information about mutant animals and so-called artefacts, which were common objects in the past, began to arrive from the territory of the Zone. Getting into the anomaly, objects acquire unique properties. Many desperate people, wanting to make money quickly, began to enter the territory of the "Zone" to obtain a valuable artefact and sell it to scientists. A year later, people appeared on the territory of the Zone, who had tattoos in the form of the abbreviation "S.T.A.L.K.E.R." As a rule, these were people who began to "live" in the Zone. Soon everyone who rushed to the Zone began to be called stalkers (something between a marauder and a guide). The events of the game take place in 2012. The protagonist is a miraculously surviving stalker from a "death truck" (used to remove the bodies of dead stalkers from the center of the Zone; such a truck has a radiation background that is many times higher than normal human living conditions). The protagonist has completely lost his memory, and the only clue is the entry in the PDA: "Kill Sagittarius." According to the tattoo "S.T.A.L.K.E.R." on the hand of the protagonist, he receives the nickname "Marked". Now he faces many difficult questions and tasks. Then came the prequel to the game - S.T.A.L.K.E.R.: Clear Sky.

Growth: the 2010s 
In 2010 a new part of the series S.T.A.L.K.E.R. - Call of Pripyat. The action of the project "S.T.A.L.K.E.R.: Call of Pripyat" unfolds after the events of the original game - that is, after the shooter destroyed the project "O-Consignment". Having received information about the opening of the road to the center of the zone, the government decides to deploy a large-scale military operation under the code name "Fairway" to receive control over Chernobyl Nuclear Power Plant. In accordance with the developed plan, the first group of military must go for air intelligence of the territory and make detailed schemes of the locations of abnormal formations. Subsequently, these safe passages will have to be secured by the main forces of the military. Despite thorough preparation, the operation fails. To collect information about the causes of the failure, the Security Service of Ukraine directs its agent to the center of the zone. Further events depend only on the player.

Also in this year, studio 4A Games released METRO 2033. The early GDC 2006 demo build of the game used the X-Ray Engine that has been used in the Stalker Game series. The game uses a multi-platform version of 4A Engine, which is transferred to the Xbox 360, PlayStation 3 and Microsoft Windows. There was a controversy where the game's engine was stated to be based on a version of X-Ray (as claimed by Sergei Grigorovich, the founder, GSC Game World, as well as users who saw screenshots of the 4A Engine SDK, marking visual similarity, shared resources and technical changes in the pre-training demo). 4A Engine was made after a GSC Game World scandal, or it is its own development (according to 4A Games and Olesya Shishkovtseva in particular, which claims it to be unthinkable to recycle X-Ray to support playing consoles). 4A Engine uses NVIDIA PHYSX support, improved artificial intelligence (AI), as well as a console SDK for Xbox 360. The PC version includes DIRECTX 11 support and is described as a "love player message" thanks to developers' decision to make a PC version [especially] phenomenal". On October 22, 2009, THQ officially announced that it will be a publisher of the game "Metro 2033". It was stated that the game will come out in early 2010 for PC and Xbox 360. Together with this statement, a game trailer was released. On November 2, 2008-2009, the Russian publisher and localizer "Akella" announced the signing of the contract with THQ on the publication of the Metro 2033 on the territory of Russia and the CIS countries.

Statistics 
As of 2018, 84% of companies developing video games create mobile games for iOS and Android. More than 50% create or plan to create games for VR / AR devices. The average salary of the developer in Ukraine - $1375. According to the study, the most popular platform for the development of games remains Unity (69%). The most massive genres are ACTION (40%) and Adventure (42%). In total, in the development of video games there are about 20,000 people. 75% of offices of companies are in Ukraine. Almost 90% of companies are developing at their own funds. The audience of games that create Ukrainian developers is more than 770 million users. The largest audience in giants - Plarium, Ubisoft and Wargaming.

Noticeable video game companies of Ukraine 

 4A Games
 AAA Game Art Studio
 AB Games
 Absolutist Ltd.
 Aliens Games (Also 'AD Games')
 Alta Games
 Arrible (Indie development, outsource)
 Best Way
 Black Mermaid Games (Also Moldovan)
 BlackMark Studio
 Blackwood Games
 Blam! Games Studios
 Creoteam
 CyberLight Game Studio
 Digital Dreams Entertainment (Development studio)
 Dream Team Studio
 Dreamate Games (Also Czech)
 Dreamtify Games
 EJaw
 ENIXAN Entertainment
 Fishing Planet LLC
 Frag Lab LLC
 Frogwares
 Game Labs
 Game-Ace
 Graviteam
 GSC Game World
 Gunzilla Games (Devs in Germany & Ukraine)
 Hamsters Gaming
 iOne-Games
 Lion's Shade (ex-Avreliy Games. Sole Ukrainian dev working with HeroCraft.)
 Marevo Collective (Changed from 'Sowoke Entertainment Bureau' in 2022.)
 Meridian'93
 Murka Games
 N-Game Studios
 Octagon Game Studio (No relation to Brazilian developer, Oktagon Games)
 Paga Group
 Pingle Studio
 Pinokl Games
 Plawius (Ukrainians in Lithuania? Also co-devs.)
 Pushka Studios
 Red Mountain Games
 RinGames
 Sengi Games
 SMOKOKO LTD (Mostly mobile games)
 Tatem Games (No relation to Russian developer, Totem Games)
 Ternox Games
 Unicore Studio
 Volmi Games
 Vostok Games
 Weasel Token
 yevhen8

Probable 
 Graphium Studio (Founded by project lead at Meridian'93)

Misc Games 

 Boolat Games (Hidden object & casual games. Part of Playrix.)
 Borna Technology (Mini games, playable ads)
 CharStudio (Casual games)
 DGN Games (Slots games)
 EvoPlay (Slots games)
 Five-BN Games (Hidden Object Games. Part of Playrix.)
 Friendly Fox studio (Formerly 4FriendsGames. Hidden object games. Part of Playrix.)
 Home Games (Mobile games & Graphic Design. Part of Playrix.)
 Jarvi Games Ltd (Mobile & online games. Nicosia HQ. Also Polish.)
 JoyRocks (Web and mobile casual games)
 Keiki (Kids edutainment)
 MysteryTag (Mobile casual games)
 Nika Entertainment (From iLogos founder. Casual games. Co-development.)
 VOKI Games (Hidden Object Games. Part of Playrix.)
 Renatus Media, LLC (Mobile casual games)
 Social Quantum (Mobile casual & casino games)
 Smart Project Ltd (Casual mobile games. Co-development, digital marketing.)
 Yarki Studio (Slots & mobile games. Co-development, outsource, art projects.)
 Zagrava Games (Mobile games/outsourcing tasks. Part of Playrix.)

Co-development Services 

 Art Road (Graphic design)
 Eforb (Co-development, outsource)
 Gamepack (outsource)
 Hamsters Gaming (Co-development, outsource)
 Hologryph (Co-development. Part of tinyBuild.)
 iLogos Game Studios (Co-development, outsource, ports)
 Innovecs (outsource)
 Kevuru Games (Co-development, outsource)
 Melior Games (outsource)
 N-iX Game & VR Studio (outsource)
 Playtestix (Co-development, outsource)
 PlayToMax (Co-development, outsource)
 Red Beat (Co-development, outsource)
 Room 8 Studio (Co-development, outsource, ports)
 Sense.Vision (User testing)
 Sinspired Studio (Design services)
 SnoopGame (Co-development, outsource, QA services)
 StageX Entertainment (outsource)
 Ulysses Graphics LLC (Formerly indie dev 'Ulysses Games' till 2008. Art, graphics.)
 VR Tigers (outsource)
 Whimsy Games (Co-development, monetization, marketing)
 Wow-How Studio (Art & animation)
 YUQIO (Co-development, outsource)

Defunct video game companies of Ukraine 

 Action Forms Ltd. (Former members setup Tatem Games. Founded 1995. Inactive/defunct after 2010.)
 Bear Games (Ex-Crystal Clear Soft. Also did outsourcing. Founded 2002. Inactive/defunct after 2015. Still active on LinkedIn but no new releases.)
 Black Wing Foundation (Founded 2007. Defunct after 2021.)
 Deep Shadows (Founded 2001. Inactive after 2017.)
 Dereza Production Studio (Founded 2001. Defunct after 2011.)
 Digital Spray Studios (Founded 2001. Inactive after 2008.)
 Newtonic Studio (Founded 2005. Division of Digital Spray Studios.)
 DVS (Founded 2000. Inactive after 2008; website closed in 2020.)
 Electronic Paradise (Founded 1995. Inactive after 2007.)
 Amax Interactive (Formerly ERS Game Studios. Founded 2006. Defunct in 2020. Split into Amax Interactive in 2017 and VOKI games.)
 JED Games (Founded 2012. Defunct in 2019.)
 Mandel ArtPlains (Founded 2003. Inactive after 2006.)
 Megalodon Studio (Founded 2016. Defunct in 2019. No games.)
 mPower Games Studio (Founded 2004. Inactive/defunct after 2019.)
 Panther Gaming Llc (Mobile casino games. Founded 2014. Defunct 2021.)
 Persha Studia (Founded 2001 as Nikitova LLC. Taken over by Wargaming in 2011.)
 X-calibur Games (Founded 2011. Inactive after 2018.)
 Butterfly iSoft (Founded in ~2006 probably in Ukraine or Russia, defunct in 2012/2013. Its designer later manages RinGames.)

Video game publishers of Ukraine

 Artificial Core (Publisher & dev. Amsterdam HQ, Kyiv development office. Online games.)
 AtomTeam (Publisher & dev. Aka. Atent Games, Ltd. Riga HQ. Main branch. Also Russian.)
 Beatshapers (Publisher, dev & porting house)
 Blackrose Arts (Publisher & dev. Online games.)
 Devil's Dozen Games (Publisher & dev)
 DogHowl Games (Publisher & dev)
 FangsLab (Publisher & dev. Ex-Fang's Lab.)
 Gismart (Publisher & dev. Mobile games. Also Belarusian.)
 Graverobber Foundation (Publisher & dev)
 IEVO (Publisher & dev)
 Mauris Games (Publisher & dev. Also IT firm.)
 Starni Games (Publisher & dev)
 Triomatica Games (Publisher & dev. Ukrainian-Slovakian.)
 VidyGames (Publisher & dev)
 WeeCodeLab B.V. (Publisher & dev. The Hague HQ. Also Russian.)
 Whale Rock Games (Publisher & dev)

Noticeable video games developed in Ukraine 

 Cossacks (video games series)
 Football, Tactics & Glory
 Frontline: Fields of Thunder
 GEM engine series (eg. Men of War series)
 Metro 2033
 Metro: Last Light
 Metro Exodus
 S.T.A.L.K.E.R.: Call of Pripyat
 S.T.A.L.K.E.R.: Clear Sky
 S.T.A.L.K.E.R.: Shadow of Chernobyl
 Survarium

Video gaming sites 
Ukrainians read news about video games primarily on the Internet sites. Here are some video gaming sites in Ukrainian:
 OpenGamer.com.ua
 PlayUA.net
 Gameplay.org.ua
 Mezda.Media outlet for IT news (Tagged page, that started in April 2022, for articles about games made in Ukraine.)

References